Wal Alexander (22 October 1923 – 17 October 1995) was an Australian rules footballer who played with Carlton and Fitzroy in the Victorian Football League (VFL).

Notes

External links 

Wal Alexander's profile at Blueseum

1923 births
Carlton Football Club players
Fitzroy Football Club players
Australian rules footballers from Victoria (Australia)
1995 deaths
People from Wodonga